Szczytna  (Shchytna) is a village in the administrative district of Gmina Pawłosiów, within Jarosław County, Subcarpathian Voivodeship, in south-eastern Poland.

The village has a population of 310.

References

Szczytna